The Read Township Culvert is a historic structure located southeast of Elkader, Iowa, United States. Clayton County built a number of bridges over rivers, streams and ditches around the turn of the 20th-century. They contracted with local contractors Stoops and Williamson to build this single stone arch culvert of native limestone for $814.25. The culvert was listed on the National Register of Historic Places in 1999.

References

Infrastructure completed in 1899
Bridges in Clayton County, Iowa
National Register of Historic Places in Clayton County, Iowa
Road bridges on the National Register of Historic Places in Iowa
Arch bridges in Iowa
Stone bridges in the United States